Huang Jiawen may refer to:

Carmaney Wong (born 1993), Hong Kong actress, model, and beauty pageant winner
Helena Wong (weightlifter) (born 1988), Singaporean weightlifter
Wong Ka Man (table tennis) (born 1985), Hong Kong para table tennis player
Wong Ka Man (footballer), Hong Kong footballer